Vinayak Rao Koratkar (3 February 1895 – 3 September 1962) was a political leader of Hyderabad State and Member of Indian Parliament.

Brief Lifesketch
He is son of Shri Keshav Rao Koratkar and Geeta Bai. He was born at Kalamb, Osmanabad district on 3 February 1895. He was educated at Gurukul Kangri Vishwavidyalaya, Haridwar and obtained Vidyalankar degree. He has studied in London University and Agricultural College, Poona. He did Bar-at-Law from Middle Temple, London in 1922.

He married Shrimati Laxmi Bai Koratkar in 1924. They had 2 sons and 1 daughter.

As a barrister, he has practiced at Bar from 1922 to 1950. He was editor of Deccan Law Reports in Hyderabad State.

He was president, Arya Pratinidhi Sabha, Hyderabad for about 19 years between 1930 and 1950. He was President of Aryan Education Society, Hindi Prachar Sabha and Education Conference of Hyderabad. He has run Hindi weekly Arya Bhanu magazine as its proprietor-editor for five years.

He was minister in Hyderabad State in several capacities from 1950 to 1956. He was Member of Hyderabad Legislature from 1952 to 1956 and worked as finance minister in Burgula Ramakrishna Rao cabinet. He was Member of Bombay Legislature from 1956 to 1957.

He was elected to the 2nd Lok Sabha from Hyderabad (Lok Sabha constituency) in 1957 as a member of Indian National Congress.

He has established Keshava Memorial School and Hindi Mahavidyalaya in Hyderabad city. He died on 3 September 1962.

References

External links
 Biodata of Vinayak Rao Koratkat at Lok Sabha website.

India MPs 1957–1962
1895 births
1962 deaths
Alumni of the University of London
People from Hyderabad State
Gurukul Kangri University alumni
People from Osmanabad district
Lok Sabha members from Andhra Pradesh
People from Marathwada
Indian National Congress politicians from Andhra Pradesh
Politicians from Hyderabad, India